"What's Luv?" is a song by American rapper Fat Joe, released through Atlantic Records and Fat Joe's Terror Squad Productions as the second single from his fourth studio album, Jealous Ones Still Envy (J.O.S.E.) (2001). The song features additional vocals from singer Ashanti and from rapper Ja Rule on the remix and album version on the song. "What's Luv" was produced by Irv Gotti and Chink Santana. The lyrics of the song's chorus are based in part on the title refrain of the 1984 Tina Turner hit "What's Love Got to Do with It". The song additionally includes a lyric ("I'm not a hater, I just crush a lot") that references the 1998 song "Still Not a Player" by Big Pun. Fat Joe, Ja Rule, and the song's two producers are credited as the writers of "What's Luv", as are Big Pun and the lyricist of "What's Love Got to Do with It", Terry Britten.

"What's Luv?", released in the United States on February 4, 2002, peaked at number two on the Billboard Hot 100 chart that April. The single stayed on the chart for 20 weeks, giving Ashanti her second top-10 single, Fat Joe his first, and Ja Rule his seventh. The song additionally topped the Billboard Hot Rap Songs and Rhythmic charts. "What's Luv?" made Ashanti the first female artist to simultaneously occupy the top two positions on the Hot 100. The single was also a success internationally, reaching the top five in Australia, New Zealand, Switzerland, and the United Kingdom.

Production
Fat Joe claimed that Ashanti recorded vocals for the demo, with the plan being to replace her on the record with Jennifer Lopez to appeal to the Latin market. When Joe heard the demo, he insisted on doing the record with Ashanti instead.

Music video
The video for "What's Luv?" was filmed in New York City, at Fordham University. The music video features cameo appearances from DJ Kay Slay, Capone, Young Noble, Kastro, Treach, Fat Joe's son, Maia Campbell as Joe's love interest, and Terror Squad members Tony Sunshine, Prospect, Armageddon, and Remy. Tommy Davidson and Miguel Núñez, Jr. also appear in the video since the song was included in the 2002 film Juwanna Mann, in which Davidson and Núñez star.

In the video, Joe starts dancing with some backup dancers, and also at times with Ashanti. One scene shows him attending a basketball game with two women as they watch from the stands. A scene with Ashanti shows her walking into a men's locker room, and rounding up with some men as she sings her verses from the song.

Track listings

US 12-inch single
A1. "What's Luv?" (clean version featuring Ashanti) – 3:51
A2. "What's Luv?" (dirty version featuring Ashanti) – 3:51
A3. "What's Luv?" (instrumental) – 3:51
B1. "Definition of a Don" (clean version featuring Remy) – 3:54
B2. "Definition of a Don" (dirty version featuring Remy) – 3:54
B3. "Definition of a Don" (instrumental) – 3:55

European CD single
 "What's Luv?" (explicit version featuring Ashanti)
 "Hustlin'" (featuring Armageddon)

UK CD single
 "What's Luv?" (clean version featuring Ashanti) – 3:51
 "What's Luv?" (explicit version featuring Ashanti) – 3:51
 "Hustlin'" (featuring Armageddon) – 3:34
 "What's Luv?" (video—clean version featuring Ashanti) – 3:51

UK 12-inch single and Australian CD single
 "What's Luv?" (clean version featuring Ashanti) – 3:51
 "What's Luv?" (explicit version featuring Ashanti) – 3:51
 "Hustlin'" (featuring Armageddon) – 3:34

Credits and personnel
Credits are lifted from the European CD single liner notes.

Studio
 Recorded at The Crackhouse Studios (New York City)

Personnel

 Fat Joe – writing (as Joseph Cartagena), vocals, executive production
 Ja Rule – writing (as Jeffrey Atkins), vocals
 Christopher Rios – writing
 Irv Gotti – writing (as Irving Lorenzo), production, mixing
 Chink Santana – writing (as Andre Parker), production
 Terry Britten – lyricist of "What's Love Got to Do with It"
 Ashanti – vocals
 Armageddon – co-executive production
 Rob "Reef" Tewlow – co-executive production
 Milwaukee Buck – recording
 Thomas Bricker – art direction and design
 Piotr Sikora – photography

Charts

Weekly charts

Year-end charts

Certifications

Release history

References

2001 singles
2001 songs
Ashanti (singer) songs
Atlantic Records singles
Fat Joe songs
Ja Rule songs
Music videos directed by Bille Woodruff
Songs written by Chink Santana
Songs written by Fat Joe
Songs written by Graham Lyle
Songs written by Irv Gotti
Songs written by Ja Rule
Songs written by Terry Britten